"More 'N' More (I Love You)" is Haiducii's fourth single, released in Italy in December 2005. This was her second single in English. The single contains two versions of the song, four Dragostea Din Tei versions (two already released and two new remixes). The single reached the top ten in Italy, peaking at number eight.

Three months after its release in March 2006, a music video premiered to help promote the song, where Haiducii can be seen with her lover and other male dancers who are used as her puppets.

This single is Haiducii's second best-selling single after "Dragostea Din Tei".

Chart performance

External links 
Lyrics of Haiducii

2005 singles
Haiducii songs